Bozhurishte is a town in western Bulgaria. It is the administrative center of Bozhurishte Municipality in Sofia Province; close to Kostinbrod and the capital Sofia. The old airport of Sofia, now a military one, is near the town. Bozhurishte was first mentioned in 1750. Its name is derived from the flower peony (bojur). soon to be part of Sofia city

TEREM, a former weapons manufacturer owned by the government and recently sold to private investors operates from Bozhurishte.
Logistics Park Bozhurishte is also part of the city economy and stands as the only large logistics, strategic storage and light industrial project in the small city.

References

Weblinks 

 Official Website
 Website
 LPB Website

Towns in Bulgaria
Populated places in Sofia Province